Murphy Bennett (born 23 December 2004) is a Welsh professional footballer who plays as a defender for  club Forest Green Rovers.

Club career
Bennett joined the scholarship program at Forest Green Rovers in June 2021, having previously been with the youth system at Manchester City and represented Wales at under-16 level. He made his first-team debut on 12 October 2021, in a 2–2 draw with Brighton & Hove Albion U21 in an EFL Trophy match at The New Lawn.

International career
Bennett was called up to the Wales under-18 squad in August 2021.

Career statistics

References

2004 births
Living people
Welsh footballers
Wales youth international footballers
Association football defenders
Manchester City F.C. players
Forest Green Rovers F.C. players
English Football League players